Hermias (sometimes Hermias Philosophus or Hermias the Philosopher) was an obscure Christian apologist, presumed to have lived in 3rd century.  Nothing is known of him, except his name.  He wrote a Derision of gentile philosophers (Diasyrmos ton Exo Philosophon), a short parody on Greek philosophical themes (the nature of the body, the soul, the world). From Paul's statement in the First Epistle to the Corinthians that "all worldly knowledge is foolishness to God" he affirms that all philosophical doctrines come from the apostasy of the angels and therefore wrong and laughable. Hermias relies rather on cynical and skeptical culture critique and on philosophical biographies and anedoctes than in their real writings.

See also 
 Antiphilosophy
 Christian philosophy
 Metaphilosophy

External links
Derision of gentile philosophers
 

3rd-century Romans
3rd-century writers
Christian apologists
Christian writers
3rd-century Christians